Burghill is an unincorporated community in southern Vernon Township, Trumbull County, Ohio, United States.  It is unincorporated although it had a post office, with the ZIP code of 44404 until 2011.  It lies along State Route 7 north of Hubbard. The community is part of the Youngstown–Warren–Boardman, OH-PA Metropolitan Statistical Area.

The community was so named on account of its lofty elevation.

References

Unincorporated communities in Trumbull County, Ohio
Articles containing video clips
Unincorporated communities in Ohio